Ros omelette, also known as ras omelette, is a snack and street food in the Goan cuisine of India. Ros means "gravy" in Konkani. It is a spicy gravy of either chicken or chickpeas, which is often similar to xacuti which is commonly seen in the Goan Catholic style of cooking. If it is not a xacuti then it is probably a spicy gravy consisting of onions, curry leaves, black mustard seeds, scraped coconut and spices mostly prepared by Goan Hindus. Ingredients such as mushrooms or cauliflower are also commonly used. The omelette contains eggs, herbs, finely chopped green chili peppers, onions (or shallots), finely chopped fresh green coriander and salt, with many variations. The ros is cooked separately. The hot ros is poured over the freshly fried omelette and served with Goan bread (Pav).

Ros omelette is traditionally sold by food carts lined across the various towns of Goa. These carts start dispensing the same early evenings and continue to serve them after midnight. A lot of restaurants also feature this dish on their menus.

Ros omelette is best served with chopped onions and a dash of lime juice sprinkled on top of the completed dish.

References

Goan cuisine
Indian egg dishes
Indian cuisine